Judith Vis (born 21 June 1980 in Rotterdam) is a Dutch former hurdler, long jumper and bobsledder.

Vis competed at the 2014 Winter Olympics for the Netherlands. She teamed with driver Esmé Kamphuis in the two-woman event, finishing 4th. This was the best ever result by a Dutch bobsleigh team. Vis and Kamphuis previously won a bronze medal at the 2011 Bobsleigh European Championship at Winterberg.

As of April 2014, her best showing at the World Championships is 6th, in both 2011 and 2013.

Vis made her World Cup debut in November 2010. As of April 2014, she has one World Cup podium finish, a silver medal at Cesana in 2010-11.

Vis retired from the sport after the 2014 Winter Olympics.

World Cup Podiums

References

1980 births
Living people
Olympic bobsledders of the Netherlands
Athletes from Rotterdam
Bobsledders at the 2014 Winter Olympics
Dutch female bobsledders
Dutch female hurdlers
Dutch female long jumpers
20th-century Dutch women
21st-century Dutch women